Bulinus natalensis is a species of a tropical freshwater snail with a sinistral shell, an aquatic gastropod mollusk in the family Planorbidae, the ramshorn snails and their allies. Its geographical distribution is largely limited to Kwazulu-Natal in South Africa. This species occurs in standing, perennial freshwater habitat and has the ability to aestivate for up to six months during a drought.

References

External links 
 

Bulinus
Gastropods described in 1841